242nd Division or 242nd Infantry Division may refer to:

 242nd Infantry Division (German Empire)
 242nd Infantry Division (Wehrmacht)
 242nd Training Centre (Russian Airborne Troops)